USS Rivalen (SP-63) was an armed motorboat that served in the United States Navy as a patrol vessel from 1917 to 1919.
 
Rivalen was built as a private wooden motorboat of the same name in 1917 by George Lawley & Son at Neponset, Massachusetts. The U.S. Navy acquired her for World War I service as a patrol vessel on a lease from her owner, W. Harry Brown of Pittsburgh, Pennsylvania, on 17 April 1917 and took delivery of her at the Boston Navy Yard at Boston, Massachusetts, on 29 June 1917. The Navy finally commissioned her as USS Rivalen (SP-63) on 12 May 1918.

Rivalen entered service as a patrol boat at Boston Harbor in May 1918, but the Navy soon found her unsuited for naval service and laid her up in July 1918. She then was inactive until returned to her owner on 5 May 1919.

Again in private use from 1919, Rivalen was sold to a new owner and renamed Tremont in 1921.  She disappeared from yacht registers in the early 1930s.

References

Department of the Navy Naval Historical Center Online Library of Selected Images: Civilian Ships: Rivalen (American Motor Boat, 1916). Served as USS Rivalen (SP-63) in 1917-1918
NavSource Online: Section Patrol Craft Photo Archive Rivalen (SP 63)

Patrol vessels of the United States Navy
World War I patrol vessels of the United States
Ships built in Boston
1917 ships